Fernanda Alves (born 29 June 1985) is a volleyball player from Brazil.

She was a member of the Brazil women's national volleyball team.

Career 
She participated in the 2005 FIVB Women's World Grand Champions Cup, and the 2017 FIVB Beach Volleyball World Championships.

Clubs
  Fluminense FC (1999–2001)
  ACF/Campos (2001–2004)
  São Caetano (2004–2005)
  Brasil Telecom (2005–2006)
  Pinheiros (2006–2007)
  Daejeon KGC (2007–2008)
  Pallavolo Cesena (2008–2010)
  Sport Recife (2009–2010)
  Praia Clube (2010–2011)
  Vôlei Futuro (2011–2012)

References

External links 

1985 births
Living people
Brazilian women's volleyball players
LGBT volleyball players
People from São Joaquim da Barra